Hammerfest or Hámmárfeasta is a town that is also the administrative centre of Hammerfest Municipality in Troms og Finnmark county, Norway. It is located on the northwestern coast of the island of Kvaløya, just north of the village of Rypefjord and southwest of the village of Forsøl.

The town has an ice-free harbor, including the nearby island of Melkøya which is home to a natural gas processing station. It processes gas from the Snøhvit gas field in the Barents Sea. Rypefjord is a suburb to the south of the town. The main church for the town and municipality is Hammerfest Church. The "midnight sun" is above the horizon from 15 May to 31 July, and the period with continuous daylight lasts a bit longer. Polar night, on the other hand, lasts from 23 November to 19 January. The town is visited by cruise ships from all over the world each summer. In 2016, there were about 19,000 tourists who visited the town of Hammerfest.

Hammerfest is the northernmost town in Norway with a population above 5,000 people.  Towns in Norway must have a population above 5,000 for that legal distinction. The nearby town of Honningsvåg in Norway is further north, but it has fewer than 5,000 inhabitants (it was declared to be a town due to a technicality in the law at the time). This is a point of contention between the two towns who both claim to be the northernmost town in Norway.  Hammerfest also claims to the world's northernmost "town" with over 5,000 inhabitants, although there are many smaller "northernmost settlements" in the world.

History
1684: Hammerfest gets its first church: Hammerfest Church.  The population is around 60 people.
1764: Russia begins to send ships with grain to Hammerfest, the so-called Pomor trade.
17 July 1789: Hammerfest receives "town status"
1792: The first doctor arrives in Hammerfest.
1807–1814: The city is ravaged by plague and wars. The blockade by the British vessels during the Napoleonic Wars lead to major food shortages.
1809: The city is looted by two British brigs.
1839: Hammerfest's first firefighter is employed.
1859: The first lighthouse in Finnmark is constructed: Fuglenes Lighthouse.
1868: The first water plant in the town is built.
1870: A telegraph station, which is used by all of Finnmark, is built.
1890: Two-thirds of the city is destroyed by fire.
1891: Reconstruction of the city begins. A Methodist chapel is opened.
1891: Hammerfest becomes the first town in Norway and Northern Europe with electric streetlights.
1940: After the German occupation of Norway the German Navy used the harbor of the city as a base.
14 February 1944: A Soviet aircraft bombed the city for the first time, but the damage was small.
29 August 1944: A similar, but far more powerful air assault, a number of buildings and streets in the city and ships on the harbour were destroyed. When the Germans retreated, they finalized the destruction. 
November 1944: the Germans began systematically burning all the settlements in Finnmark, including Hammerfest.
February 1945: citizens are forcibly evacuated by the German authorities. Only one building was left standing, a burial chapel. This was built in 1937 and is the oldest house still existing in the town.
1989: Hammerfest celebrates its 200th anniversary as a city.
2003: Melkøysund Tunnel is completed connecting the town to the island of Melkøya.
2007: The Snøhvit plant on Melkøya becomes operational in September. It is the biggest industrial development in Northern Norway.

Municipal history
The municipality called Hammerfest by og landdistrikt was established on 1 January 1838 (see formannskapsdistrikt). It included the town of Hammerfest and the vast rural district surrounding it.  The law required that all towns should be separated from their rural districts, but because of low population, and very few voters, this was impossible to carry out for Hammerfest in 1838. (This was also the case in the towns of Vadsø and Vardø.)  In 1839, the northern district (population: 498) was separated to become the new municipality of Maasø.  This left Hammerfest by og landdistrikt with 2,024 residents.  On 1 January 1852, Hammerfest was divided.  The rural district outside of the town (population: 1,256) became the new municipality of Hammerfest landdistrikt.  This left just the town remaining in what was once a vast municipality of Hammerfest.   The town at this time had 1,125 residents. (The rural district was later divided into two municipalities with Sørøysund in the north and Kvalsund in the south.)  On 1 January 1992, the town of Hammerfest (population: 6,909) was merged with the neighboring municipality of Sørøysund (population: 2,341) to form a new, larger Hammerfest Municipality.

Climate

Media gallery

See also
List of towns and cities in Norway

References

 
Cities and towns in Norway
Port cities and towns in Norway
Populated places of Arctic Norway